Kalikiri is a town in Annamayya district of Andhra Pradesh state in India. It is the Mandal headquarters of Kalikiri Area.

Educational institutes

Colleges
 Govt. Polytechnic college
 Govt. Horticulture Polytechnic College
 JNTUA College of Engineering, KALIKIRI
 SEICOM Degree College
 Srinivasa Degree college

Schools
 Akshara English Medium High School
 Rayalaseema High School
 Sainik School
 Santhiniketan High School

Notable people 
 Nallari Kiran Kumar Reddy – Ex Chief Minister of Combined Andhra Pradesh

References 

Villages in Annamayya district
Mandal headquarters in Annamayya district